The Harlem River is an  tidal strait in New York, United States, flowing between the Hudson River and the East River and separating the island of Manhattan from the Bronx on the New York mainland.

The northern stretch, also called the Spuyten Duyvil ("spewing devil") Creek, has been significantly altered for navigation purposes. Originally it curved around the north of Marble Hill, but in 1895 the Harlem River Ship Canal was dug between Manhattan and Marble Hill, and in 1914 the original course was filled in.

Use
Harlem River Drive and Harlem River Greenway run along the west bank of the river, and the Metro-North Railroad's Hudson Line and Major Deegan Expressway on the east.

The Harlem River was the traditional rowing course for New York, analogous to the Charles River in Boston and the Schuylkill River in Philadelphia. On the Harlem's banks is the boathouse for the Columbia University crew, and the river is the home course for the university's crew. Since 1952, a large flat rock face, called the "(Big) C Rock" has been painted with Columbia's varsity "C". Also on the river are the Peter Jay Sharp Boathouse and Harlem River Community Rowing, two community rowing facilities. The river is used by crews from New York University, Fordham University, and Manhattan College, though the only university with permanent facilities on the river is Columbia.

Historically, the west bank of the Harlem River was also an amusement destination. The area between 190th and 192nd Streets was occupied by the Fort George Amusement Park, a trolley park/amusement park, from 1895 to 1914. Its site is now a seating area in Highbridge Park. In the 1890s, the City of New York built a racetrack for horses, the Harlem River Speedway, along the riverbank of the park; the project started construction in 1894 and opened in July 1898. The Speedway later became the Harlem River Drive, and regular motorists were first allowed on the drive in 1919.

Crossings 

These bridges replaced fixed bridges or lower bridges in the late 19th century to improve navigation. High Bridge was erected between 1837 and 1848 to carry the Croton Aqueduct across the river. It is the oldest bridge in New York City.

The New York City Department of Transportation advises that while they make every effort to ensure that all bridges are operating, many of them are under repair at any time, and outside contractors are responsible for opening of bridges under repair.

See also
 Geography of New York City
 Geography of New York Harbor
 List of New York rivers

References
Notes

Further reading
 , a novel that highlights the Harlem River and its surroundings

External links
 

 
Transportation in New York (state)
Straits of Bronx County, New York
Straits of New York County, New York